An armed boarding steamer (or "armed boarding ship", or "armed boarding vessel") was a merchantman that the British Royal Navy converted to a warship during the First World War. AB steamers or vessels had the role of enforcing wartime blockades by intercepting and boarding foreign vessels. The boarding party would inspect the foreign ship to determine whether to detain the ship and send it into port or permit it to go on its way.

Origins

On 28 September 1914 Admiral John Jellicoe, commander-in-chief of the Grand Fleet, sent a telegram in which he pointed out that he did not have enough destroyers available to enforce the blockade. Furthermore, the weather was often too severe for the destroyers.

Each armed boarding steamer was to carry two 3-pounder guns (47 mm/L50) and be under the command of an officer from the Royal Navy. These 12 vessels were requisitioned in October and completed by mid to late-November. Other vessels followed.

The Navy found that cross-Channel passenger vessels were particularly suitable because of their large cargo capacity. As experience with the programme increased, the armed boarding vessels received heavier armament. The Royal Navy realized the need for heavier armament after the German auxiliary cruiser  attacked and sank the armed boarding ship HMS Ramsey on 8 August 1915. The navy wanted to arm the boarding ships with some obsolete 14-inch torpedo tubes, and modern  guns (possibly the BL 4 inch naval gun Mk VII); Meteor had sunk Ramsey using both a torpedo, and gunfire from two 88 mm (3.5-inch) guns.

The Navy pressed the vessels into other roles. Some carried depth charges for anti-submarine duty while escorting convoys. Still others, particularly in the Mediterranean, served as transports. A quarter were lost during active duty in the war; eight sunk by submarines, one by a German auxiliary cruiser, and one by mines. Two went on to serve again in WWII, with one then being lost to bombing.

Vessels

  – returned to owners 21 November 1919
  – ABS from October 1914 until returned to owners 29 September 1919
  – 1913 yacht purchased September 1939 and sold 1946
 HMS Caesarea – Launched in 1910 and served as ABS 31 October 1914 to December 1915. Became Manxmaid and served as Brucce in WWII.
 HMS  – Launched in 1897 and hired as ABS on 8 August 1914; hospital ship 7 August 1915
  – Launched in 1906; ABS from 22 November 1914 to 9 October 1919.
 HMS  – launched 1893; ABS from 30 October 1914 to 3 October 1919
 HMS  – Launched 1891; ABS from 30 October 1814 to 6 November 1919
 HMS 
 HMS Duke of Cornwall
 HMS  – took part in the action of 16 March 1917, the destruction of the German auxiliary cruiser .  torpedoed Dundee on 2 September 1917 off the Isles of Scilly, causing her to sink the next day.
  – Launched 1912; hired February 1915 as a store carrier, and ABS from 19 March 1915. Sunk by a mine in the Downs off the North Foreland on 9 March 1916.
  – Wrecked 6 September 1917 on the Pentland Skerries
  – Launched 1898; ABS from 5 January 1915 to 1 April 1919
  – Launched 1905; hired as a store carrier 5 August 1914 and ABS from 14 February 1916.
  – Launched 1907; ABS from 14 November 1914 to 17 February 1919
  – Launched 1906; ABS from 18 November 1914 to 6 July 1920; troop transport July 1917 to January 1918.
 HMS  – also served during World War II as an ocean boarding vessel; sunk during the Dunkirk evacuation.
  – Launched 1905; ABS from 12 July 1915 to 17 January 1918
  – Launched 1905; ABS from 20 July 1915 to 22 January 1919
  – Launched 1906. ABS from 15 November 1914. Action with a U-boat on 15 March 1915. HMS Partridge (II) from 1916 to 12 July 1920.
 HMS 
  – on 1 October 1918 beat off two attacks by a U-boat in the Bay of Biscay
  – Launched 1892. ABS from 5 June 1915 to November 1916.
  – Launched 1908; ABS from 15 January 1915 to 26 February 1919
  – Launched 1909. ABS from 14 November 1914 to 7 July 1917 and again from 11 July 1918 to 15 June 1920.
  – Launched 910. ABS from 28 October 1914 to 12 January 1919.
 HMS  –  sank her in the Mediterranean Sea off Alexandria, Egypt,, with the loss of 55 crew.
 
 
 HMS Tara – sunk by torpedo  in Sollum Bay on the Egyptian coast on 5 November 1915
  – Launched 1894; Accommodation ship from 21 August 1914 to December, then decoy ship Antwerp from 1 January 1915 to 28 April 1915, and lastly ABS from 29 March 1915 to 25 August 1919.
  – Launched 1906 as Woodcock; ABS from 15 November 1914 to 31 March 1920
  – Launched 1907; ABS 3 January 1915 to 4 April 1919.

See also
 Action of 16 March 1917 SS Dundee
 Ocean boarding vessel British vessels of similar purpose in the Second World War
 Hired armed vessels British vessels that performed convoy escort duties, anti-privateer patrols and ran errands during the French Revolutionary Wars and the Napoleonic Wars and earlier.
 Armed merchantman

Notes

Citations

References

 
 
 

Ship types
British inventions